The Black Assize is a name given to multiple deaths in the city of Oxford in England between 6 July and 12 August 1577. At least 300 people, including the chief baron and sheriff, are thought to have died as a result of this event. It received its name because it was believed to have been associated with a trial at the Assize Court at Oxford Castle.

Casualties
Reports vary as to the total number of deaths that occurred in the "Black Assize". The casualties in Oxford itself are consistently recorded as approximately 300, but some reports say that further deaths occurred outside the city. One report records:

This reported lack of deaths among women and children led to speculation about the causes of the casualties.

Possible causes
On the wall inside the Main Hall of the Old County Hall of Oxfordshire in New Road, an inscription reads:

From the time of the Black Death in the mid-14th century until the second half of the 19th century, Oxford was regularly visited by plague, cholera, smallpox and typhoid fevers. In 1348, the Black Death reduced the city's population to such an extent that Gloucester College (from which Gloucester Green derives its name) was forced to close. In 1571, Oxford University had to postpone the start of term because of an outbreak of plague, and the 'gaol fever' six years later may have been part of the same epidemic, being considered more worthy of note because its victims included the Lord Chief Baron and the Lord High Sheriff.

This account of disease is reflected in a number of sources.

An early Chronicle records:

A 19th-century account is more sure of the cause:

Other accounts reject the notion of disease as a cause:

Further accounts merely attribute the deaths to a curse supposedly uttered by Rowland Jenkes.

Popular culture
The Black Assizes has featured as a display at Oxford Castle and is a regular feature of Oxford ghost tours, where the story of Rowland Jenkes' curse is given prominence.

The events of this time are part of the backdrop to the historical crime novel Heresy by S. J. Parris in which Rowland Jenkes appears as a character.

See also
 Black Assize of Exeter 1586

References

Sources
 

1577 in England
16th century in Oxfordshire
Black Assizes
History of Oxford
Tudor England